Kobie McGurk (born 20 August 1985) is an Australian field hockey player who competed in the 2008 Summer Olympics and 2012 Summer Olympics.

McGurk is from Collie, Western Australia.

References

External links
 

1985 births
Living people
Australian female field hockey players
Olympic field hockey players of Australia
Field hockey people from Western Australia
Field hockey players at the 2008 Summer Olympics
Field hockey players at the 2012 Summer Olympics
People from Collie, Western Australia
Commonwealth Games medallists in field hockey
Commonwealth Games gold medallists for Australia
Field hockey players at the 2002 Commonwealth Games
Medallists at the 2006 Commonwealth Games